The Croll Building, in Alameda, California, was the site of Croll's Gardens and Hotel, famous as training quarters for some of the greatest fighters in boxing history from 1883 to 1914. James J. Corbett, Bob Fitzsimmons, Jim Jefferies, Jack Johnson, and many other champions all stayed and trained here.

Today this building is home to 1400 Bar & Grill.  The stained glass, elaborate etched windows, and carved wooden bar remain as they were when Neptune Beach was a popular attraction.

The second floor of the building is currently a residential hotel, with the third floor of the building being office space.

The building is registered as California Historical Landmark and is listed on the National Register of Historic Places (NPS-82000960). It is located at the corner of Webster Street and Central Avenue. A large "Croll's" neon sign marks the location.

See also

 National Register of Historic Places listings in Alameda County, California

References

External links

Commercial buildings completed in 1879
Buildings and structures in Alameda, California
Boxing venues in California
California Historical Landmarks
Commercial buildings on the National Register of Historic Places in California
National Register of Historic Places in Alameda County, California
Italianate architecture in California
Victorian architecture in California
Sports venues on the National Register of Historic Places in California